Self-Portrait in Profile (Inventory 1890, N. 1797) is a 1590s oil on canvas painting by Annibale Carracci, acquired by Leopoldo de' Medici and now part of the collection of artists' self-portraits in the Uffizi, which also includes another self-portrait. As of 1686 it hung alongside another portrait previously thought to be another Carracci self-portrait (inv. 1890, 1803)

References

1590s paintings
16th-century portraits
Portraits of men
Paintings in the collection of the Uffizi
Paintings by Annibale Carracci
Carracci